Broughton Lane railway station was a railway station in Sheffield, South Yorkshire, England. The station served the communities of Darnall, Attercliffe and Carbrook and was one of those opened on 1 August 1864 with the South Yorkshire Railway's extension south from Tinsley Junction to Woodburn Junction where it met the Manchester, Sheffield and Lincolnshire Railway (MS&LR). The day the line was opened the SYR became part of the MS&LR. This link allowed the MS&LR access to Barnsley and Rotherham from Sheffield Victoria.

The station, with its main access by steps from Broughton Lane bridge, possessed two flanking platforms although was surrounded by sidings. The station closed on 3 April 1956 and there are now no signs of it ever existing. In the 1960s a new line was built from near Broughton Lane into the newly opened Tinsley Marshalling Yard and shortly afterwards this was electrified. The site of the station is below the new Greenland Road viaduct over the line and canal near the foundations of the old bridge. Sheffield Supertram now uses the site and the nearest tram stop is near the local arena. The sign for Broughton Lane Junction still exists and is visible from the Supertram tracks.

References

Disused railway stations in Sheffield
Former Great Central Railway stations
Railway stations in Great Britain opened in 1864
Railway stations in Great Britain closed in 1956